The Hammer of Eden is a work by Ken Follett published in 1998.

Plot 
It is about a group of people living together in a commune cut off from the rest of the world. When their commune is threatened by a plan to build a dam, they turn desperate and devise a devious plan to arm-twist the governor of California to abandon the project. They transform themselves into eco-terrorists and threaten to start an earthquake if their demands are not met. They set off a series of earthquakes using a stolen seismic vibrator truck from an oil firm. Their leader is an illiterate man called Priest who is helped by a seismology student called Melanie in his plans. Judy Maddox, an FBI agent, is the only one who can stop them and the rest of the story revolves around how she tries to do so.

List of characters

Main characters 
 Richard "Priest" Granger: leader of the municipality. He does not hesitate to commit a series of murders to succeed in his insane enterprise. Charismatic personality, he manages to easily manipulate both internal and external people. Although he is neither able to read nor write, he always manages to find a solution not to make others understand that.
 Judy Maddox: agent of the FBI, of an American father and a Vietnamese mother. As a child she experienced the fear of an earthquake. At the beginning of the book, despite having brilliantly solved a case, she does not get a well-deserved promotion which will instead go to a colleague of hers, a friend of her direct superior. Despite this, faced with the threat of the group  The Hammer of Eden  Judy manages to emerge and be appreciated by the upper echelons.
 Stella "Star" Higgins: companion of Priest and mother of his oldest child. Stereotype of the classic hippie who, having reached a certain age, behaves as those who contested when she was younger. For example, the relationship between Melanie and Priest suffers greatly, which is not usual among hippies, who support free love.
 Michael Quercus: seismologist, husband of Melanie and father of their son. He suffers the theft by his wife and Priest of the maps which list the seismic points most sensitive to the action of the seismic vibrator. Helps Judy Maddox, with whom he forms a relationship, stop the commune.
 Melanie Quercus: Michael's ex-wife and member of the commune. Weak personality, she needs an authoritative male figure. By playing on her weakness Priest persuades her to do anything.

Secondary characters 
 Dusty Quercus: son of Michael and Melanie, suffering from multiple allergies.
 Bo Maddox: Judy's father and police officer.
 Raja Khan: works in the FBI, Judy's colleague.
 Don Riley: Judy's ex-boyfriend, cheated on her with another woman. Repentant, he tries to get closer to the girl, but she no longer loves him.
 Mike Robson: California governor, gets involved in a vain FBI attempt to set a trap for Priest.
 At Honeymoon: governor's right arm.
 Flower: daughter of Star and Priest, dreams of becoming a writer. She tries to get in touch with the civilized world and she likes fashion and movie stars, so much so that she is arrested for stealing a poster of Leonardo DiCaprio.
 Other members of the hippie commune:
 Oaktree
 Dale
 Poem
 Aneth
 Bones

Reception
Carlos Ramet noted that the character of Judy Maddox, one of the novel's main protagonists, is an example of the a change in Follet's writing that begun with The Third Twin, i.e. "the change in emphasis from male to female perspective" and the development of capable and heroical female characters. He also observes that Maddox's contempt for her superiors, described as the "suits" and "the big shot[s]" from Washington", is representative of Follet's "post-war British ambivalence towards American materialism". With regards to the novel structure, Ramet argues that it combines the "formulaic hunter/hunted device" with "Buchanesque and Hitchcockian elements", and also shows inspiration from Ian Fleming's works.

References

1998 British novels
Novels by Ken Follett
British thriller novels
Works about earthquakes
Seismology in fiction
Pan Books books